The women's 100 metre butterfly heats and semifinals at the 2010 Youth Olympic Games took place on August 19 with the final on August 20 at the Singapore Sports School.

Medalists

Heats

Heat 1

Heat 2

Heat 3

Heat 4

Heat 5

Semifinals

Semifinal 1

Semifinal 2

Final

References
 Heat Results
 Semifinals Results
 Final Result

Swimming at the 2010 Summer Youth Olympics
Women's 100 metre butterfly
2010 in women's swimming